Nihil is a 1995 album by German industrial band KMFDM. It may also refer to:

Nihil, concept of Nothingness

Law
Nihil obstat
Nihil novi

Books
 "Nihil", poem by Jean Passerat in 1588
 Nihil, an invisible planet whose inhabitants invade the Earth in the 1964 science fiction novel, Beyond the Spectrum
Annihilus, an alien character in the Marvel Comics

Music
 Nihil (Impaled Nazarene album) 2007
"Nihil", a 1991 song by Godflesh Cold World (EP)
"Nihil", a song by Ghostemane from the 2018 album |N/O/I/S/E/]]

Video Games
In Warframe, Nihil is the third Orokin NPC to be defeated by the player.

See also
Nihilism
Nihilist (disambiguation)